James Golding may refer to:
 James Golding (cricketer)
 James Golding (racing driver)
 James Golding (footballer)
 Japhia Life (James E. Golding), American singer and hip hop musician